Ragna Björg Ingólfsdóttir (born 22 February 1983) is an Icelandic badminton player. She represented Iceland in 2008 Beijing and again at the 2012 London Summer Olympics. She trained at the Tennis og badmintonfélag Reykjavíku, and educated philosophy of psychology at the University of Iceland. In 2011, she commented on skirts boosting popularity in badminton.

Achievements

BWF International Challenge/Series 
Women's singles

Women's doubles

  BWF International Challenge tournament
  BWF International Series tournament
  BWF Future Series tournament

References

External links 
 
 

Ragna Ingolfsdottir
1983 births
Living people
Ragna Ingolfsdottir
Ragna Ingolfsdottir
Badminton players at the 2008 Summer Olympics
Badminton players at the 2012 Summer Olympics